Trichiosoma is a genus of cimbicid sawflies in the family Cimbicidae. There are more than 30 described species in Trichiosoma.

Species
These 22 species belong to the genus Trichiosoma:

 Trichiosoma aenescens Gussakovskij, 1947
 Trichiosoma crassum Kirby, 1882
 Trichiosoma himalayanum Malaise, 1939
 Trichiosoma kontuniemii Saarinen, 1950
 Trichiosoma laterale Leach, 1817
 Trichiosoma latreillii Leach, 1817
 Trichiosoma lucorum (Linnaeus, 1758)
 Trichiosoma malaisei Saarinen, 1950
 Trichiosoma nanae Vikberg & Viitasaari, 1991
 Trichiosoma nigricoma Konow, 1906
 Trichiosoma pusillum Leach, 1817
 Trichiosoma sachalinense Matsumura, 1911
 Trichiosoma scalesii Leach, 1817
 Trichiosoma sericeum Konow, 1903
 Trichiosoma sibiricum Gussakovskij, 1947
 Trichiosoma sorbi Hartig, 1840
 Trichiosoma sylvaticum Leach, 1817
 Trichiosoma tibiale Stephens, 1835
 Trichiosoma triangulum Kirby, 1837 (giant birch sawfly)
 Trichiosoma villosum (Motschulsky, 1860)
 Trichiosoma vitellina (Linnaeus, 1760)
 Trichiosoma vitellinae (Linné, 1761)

References

External links

 

Tenthredinoidea